Favara is a town and comune of south central Sicily (Italy), in the province of Agrigento,  north-east of Agrigento by road, with which it forms a conurbation.

Historically, the town has had a considerable agricultural trade, and there are sulfur and other mines in the neighborhood.

It is regionally famous for the Easter Lamb, a local pastry produced there from almonds and pistachios.

Territory

The town is located on the slope of a 533 m hill, Monte Caltafaraci, locally known as the Muntaggnedda (little mountain in Sicilian). The average elevation is 338 m, with a minimum of 20 m and a maximum of 533 m. Favara is part of the agricultural region #5 Agrigento seaside hills. The local climate falls into the Csa category of the Köppen climate classification, i.e. a warm Mediterranean climate with hot and dry summers and temperate winters, with temperature rarely dropping below 0 °C.

History

The first signs of human habitation of the area can be dated to the late copper age (2400-1990 a.C.), with monochrome red pottery in the Malpasso style found in a cave in contrada Ticchiara. An excavation of a later burial site (1900-1450 a.C.) from contrada Grazia Vicina has yielded gray achromatic ceramic with connection to the Conca d'Oro style (late copper age in the Palermo region) and to archaic forms of the Castelluccio style (early Bronze Age in central-southern Sicily). Another burial site has been identified in contrada San Vincenzo, which can be dated to the middle Bronze Age (around 1450 a.C.).

Remains of a fortification dating to the period of the Greek colonies in Sicily can be found in Contrada Caltafaraci. Following the Roman and Byzantine domination, the Saracen established themselves in Sicily in the 9th and 10th century. A settlement flourished in contrada Saraceno and many traces of their domination can still be found in the denomination of local geographical places. The name of the town itself originates from the Arabian fawwāra, meaning "Gurgling pool of water".

During the subsequent Norman domination several large structures were built, among others the Chiaramonte Castle, also known as the Medieval Palace. In the 14th century the castle passed to the Chiaramonte family, from which it took its current name. In the 15th century, although protected by city walls, the town underwent a period of population decline, especially between 1439 and 1464. This trend was reversed from 1478 to 1497. In the 16th century the efforts of the De Marinis family contributed to a greater development of Favara.

In the 19th century, in the background of the unification of Italy and up to 1883, Favara was the main hub of a large criminal organization known as Fratellanza di Favara.

In contemporary history, the mayor of Favara, Gaetano Guarino, was murdered on May 16, 1946, by unknown perpetrators.

Calogero Marrone (1889-1945), Righteous Among the Nations, was born and raised in Favara.

Main sights
The town possesses a Castle of the 11th- to 15th-century noble Chiaramonte family, erected in 1280.

Twin towns
 Andújar, Spain, since 2004

References

External links 

 

Municipalities of the Province of Agrigento
Castles in Italy